Soyuz T-11 was the sixth expedition to the Soviet Salyut 7 space station, which in 1984 carried the first Indian cosmonaut along with Soviet crew members.

Salyut 7 was uncrewed after the undocking of Soyuz T-11 in October 1984 until Soyuz T-13 docked with the station in June 1985. Salyut 7 developed problems during the time it was uncrewed, which meant that the crew of Soyuz T-13 had to perform a manual docking and do repairs to the station.

Crew

Backup crew

Mission parameters
Mass: 6850 kg
Perigee: 195 km
Apogee: 224 km
Inclination: 51.6°
Period: 88.7 minutes

Mission highlights
Rakesh Sharma, aboard Salyut 7 for 7 days, 21 hours, and 40 minutes, conducted an Earth observation program concentrating on India. He also did life sciences and materials processing experiments, including silicium fusing tests. He is also reported to have experimented with practicing yoga to deal with the effects of prolonged orbital spaceflight.

References

Crewed Soyuz missions
1984 in spaceflight
1984 in the Soviet Union
India–Soviet Union relations
Spacecraft launched in 1984